Marianca may refer to one of two places in Moldova:

Marianca de Jos, a commune in Ștefan Vodă District
Marianca de Sus, a village in Zaim Commune, Căușeni District